Partridge Lake is a lake in the Yukon and British Columbia, Canada that is part of the Bering Sea drainage basin. The primary inflow, at the south, and outflow, at the north, is the Partridge River, which flows via Bennett Lake, the Nares River, Tagish Lake, the Tagish River and the Yukon River to the Bering Sea. A secondary inflow, at the southwest, is Jones Creek.

See also
List of lakes in Ontario

References

Lakes of Yukon
Lakes of British Columbia